USS Rodgers may refer to the following ships of the United States Navy: 

  was a steam whaler launched in 1879 as Mary and Helen. She was purchased by the Navy in 1881 and was lost in an accidental fire later that same year.
  was a  commissioned in 1898 and decommissioned in 1919.
  was a  commissioned in 1919 and transferred to the Royal Navy as HMS Sherwood in 1940.

See also
 
 

United States Navy ship names